Osprey Meadows Golf Course is an 18-hole championship golf course in the western United States, located at Tamarack Resort near Donnelly, Idaho. Designed by Robert Trent Jones II, it opened  in May 2006, and was rated by Golf Digest as the top public course in Idaho in August 2015.

The majority owners of Tamarack Resort filed for Chapter 11 bankruptcy in February 2008 and the resort was closed in March 2009, but the golf course opened that July and continued operations through the 2014 season. It did not open in 2015, due to ongoing proceedings and ownership issues and was sold in 2016.

Scorecard

The tees' names correspond to the difficulty ratings of alpine ski runs.

Video
YouTube – Osprey Meadows Golf Course at Tamarack Resort by Air (2013)

References

External links
Golf Course Gurus – Osprey Meadows at Tamarack

Golf clubs and courses in Idaho
Buildings and structures in Valley County, Idaho
Tourist attractions in Valley County, Idaho
2006 establishments in Idaho